Clarence "Jack" Matchett (February 4, 1908 – March 19, 1979) was a pitcher in Negro league baseball. He played for the Kansas City Monarchs and Cincinnati Clowns between 1940 and 1945.

References

External links
 and Seamheads

1908 births
1979 deaths
Kansas City Monarchs players
People from Palestine, Texas
20th-century African-American sportspeople